"I Hate You Then I Love You" is a song sung as a duet between Celine Dion and Luciano Pavarotti. It was first released as a track on Celine Dion's 1997 album Let's Talk About Love. It was later released in Italy as a promotional single on 7 September 1998.

Background
"I Hate You Then I Love You" (slightly modified "Never, Never, Never" by Shirley Bassey) is an adaptation of the Italian song "Grande grande grande" sung by Mina. Dion and Pavarotti performed this song live during the Pavarotti & Friends for the Children of Liberia benefit concert on 9 June 1998.

CD and DVD release
The CD and DVD with this event were released on 20 October 1998. The recording of this song was included as a bonus on the Au cœur du stade DVD.

Music video
The music video uses footage from the benefit concert, the recording sessions and footage from Africa where the aid was needed or the benefit concert.

Critical reception
New York Observer editor Jonathan Bernstein wrote: "Luciano Pavarotti has sung with Bryan Adams, Elton John and Bono. But Dion has something his previous pop partners have lacked. She’s audible. This proves to be a hideous miscalculation, given the caliber of song they’ve chosen to share. "I Hate You Then I Love You," a retitled remake of an old Shirley Bassey song, "Never Never Never," is a clattering camp travesty during which the big man and the little sparrow indulge in some pent-up sexual jousting. All the unleashed octaves in the world fail to expunge the mental image of the most unfeasible coupling since Biggie Smalls and Li’l Kim".

Formats and track listings
Italian promotional CD single 
"I Hate You Then I Love You" (Radio Edit) – 4:27

References

External links
 
 

1997 songs
1998 singles
1990s ballads
Celine Dion songs
Columbia Records singles
Epic Records singles
Pop ballads
Song recordings produced by David Foster
Songs with lyrics by Alberto Testa (lyricist)
Songs with lyrics by Norman Newell
Songs with music by Tony Renis
Male–female vocal duets